Francesco Castegnaro (born 28 April 1994) is an Italian former track and road cyclist. He competed in the omnium event at the 2014 UCI Track Cycling World Championships. He finished third in the Gran Premio della Liberazione one-day race in 2015 and 2016.

References

External links

1994 births
Living people
Italian track cyclists
Italian male cyclists
Cyclists from the Province of Verona